Jennifer Lynn Barnes is an American writer of young adult novels.

Personal life 
Barnes was born in Tulsa, Oklahoma.

She graduated from high school in 2002, then attended Yale University, where she studied cognitive science. She graduated with a bachelor's degree from the university in 2006 and a Ph. D. in 2012.

She is married and has three sons.

Career 
Barnes wrote her first novel at age nineteen and sold five books while completing university.

After receiving her Ph. D. from Yale University, she conducted autism research at the University of Cambridge. She now serves as an Associate Professor of both Psychology and Professional Writing at the University of Oklahoma. In 2019, she received the university's Robert Glenn Rapp Foundation Presidential Professorship.

Book series

The Inheritance Games (2020–2022) 

The Inheritance Games is a young adult novel series, published by Little, Brown Books for Young Readers. The series currently consists of three books: The Inheritance Games (2020), The Hawthorne Legacy (2021), and The Final Gambit (2022). 

The first book in the series, The Inheritance Games, is a New York Times and IndieBound best seller. It was nominated for the Edgar Award for Young Adult, the Goodreads Choice Award for Young Adult, and YALSA's Teen's Top Ten, and was selected for YALSA's Quick Picks for Reluctant Young Adult Readers and Best Fiction for Young Adults and Kirkus Reviews' Best Books of 2020.

The Hawthorne Legacy was a finalist for a Goodreads Choice Award for Young Adult Fiction.

The Final Gambit won the 2022 Goodreads Choice Awards for Best Young Adult Fiction

Debutantes (2018–2019) 

Debutantes is a young adult mystery novel series published by Freeform. The series consist of two books: Little White Lies (2018) and Deadly Little Scandals (2019).

The Fixer (2015–2016) 

The Fixer is a young adult mystery novel series published by Bloomsbury Children's Books. The series consists of two books: The Fixer (2015) and The Long Game (2016).

The first book in the series, The Fixer, was nominated for the South Carolina Book Award for Young Adult (2018) and the Missouri Truman Readers Award (2018).

The Naturals (2013–2017) 

The Naturals is a young adult novel series published by Disney-Hyperion. The series consists of five books: The Naturals (2013), Killer Instinct (2014), All In (2015), Bad Blood (2016), and Twelve (2017).

The first book in the series, The Naturals, was nominated for the Lincoln Award and the Missouri Gateway Readers Award in 2018 and was a YALSA Best Fiction for Young Adults selection in 2014.

Publications

References 

Living people
American young adult novelists
Yale University alumni
Writers from Tulsa, Oklahoma
Year of birth missing (living people)
University of Oklahoma faculty
21st-century American women writers
21st-century American novelists
American women novelists
Novelists from Oklahoma